Leshnicë e Poshtme ( Kato Lesinitsa) is a village in the Vlorë County in Albania, adjacent to the Greek-Albanian borders. At the 2015 local government reform it became part of the municipality Finiq. It is located less than 1 km north-west of the Greek border. It consists of ethnic Greek population.

Geography
The village is situated on an altitude of 648 meters (2129 ft) above the sea-level.

Nearest places
Leshnica e Sipërme
Tsamantas
Cerkovica

See also
 Web site
 Photos from the village
 Video presentation

References 

Greek communities in Albania
Populated places in Finiq
Villages in Vlorë County